Kim In (November 23, 1943 – April 4, 2021) was a South Korean professional Go player.

Biography 
Kim In became a professional in 1958 when he was 15. He was a student at the legendary Minoru Kitani school in 1962 and left to return home a year later. He was promoted to 9 dan in 1983, and was the third ever 9 dan in Korea. He was famous for his playing in the 1960's and 1970's. Until his death he was managing director for the Hanguk Kiwon.

Promotion record

Titles & runners-up 
Ranks #3 in total number of titles in Korea.

References

External links
Hanguk Kiwon profile 
Article "Kim In and his life in Japan"

1943 births
2021 deaths
South Korean Go players
People from Gangjin County
Deaths from stomach cancer
Deaths from cancer in South Korea
Sportspeople from South Jeolla Province